Claytosmunda is a genus of fern. It has only one extant species, Claytosmunda claytoniana (synonym Osmunda claytoniana), the interrupted fern, native to Eastern Asia, Eastern United States, and Eastern Canada.

The specific epithet is named after the English-born Virginian botanist John Clayton. "Interrupted" describes the gap in middle of the blade left by the fertile portions after they wither and eventually fall off.

The plant is known from fossils to have grown in Europe, showing a previous circumboreal distribution. Fragmentary foliage resembling Claytosmunda has been found in the fossil record as far back as the Triassic.

Description

The lower end is also slightly thinner than the rest of the frond because the first segments are shorter. Three to seven short, cinnamon-colored fertile segments are inserted in the middle of the length, giving the plant its name.

In their absence, the plant in all its stages appears similar to Osmundastrum cinnamomeum (cinnamon fern). The base of the segments distinguishes the two species: where O. cinnamomeum has typical felt-like hairs, the few hairs present on C. claytoniana are extremely short, usually requiring a magnifying glass to see well.

Like other species in the family Osmundaceae, it grows a very large rhizome, with persistent stipe bases from previous years. It forms small, dense colonies, spreading locally through its rhizome, and often forming fairy rings.

Taxonomy
The species was first described by Carl Linnaeus in 1753, as Osmunda claytoniana. In 2005, it was recognized as being somewhat different from other species in the genus by being placed in a separate subgenus, Osmunda subgenus Claytosmunda. In 2016, the subgenus was raised to a new genus, Claytosmunda, as part of the Pteridophyte Phylogeny Group classification (PPG I). The change of genus is recognized in some taxonomic databases. Others place the species in the genus Osmundastrum. The oldest known species of Claytosmunda is C. beardmorensis, from the Middle Triassic of Antarctica. Claytosmunda when considering fossils is paraphyletic, as some of the fossils are likely to be more closely related to modern Osmunda and Plenasium than they are to the modern C. claytoniana.

Extinct species 
After

 †C. beardmorensis (J.M.Schopf, 1978) (Middle Triassic: East Antarctica).
 †C. chengii Blomfleur et al. 2017 (Middle Jurassic: Liaoning, China).
 †C. johnstonii (Tidwell, Munzing & M.R.Banks, 1991) (?Early Jurassic: Tasmania, Australia).
 †C. embreii (Stockey & S.Y.Sm., 2000) (Early Cretaceous: California, USA).
 †C. liaoningensis (Wu Zhang & Shao-Lin Zheng, 1991) (Middle Jurassic: Liaoning, China).
 †C. nathorstii (C.N.Mill., 1967) (Palaeogene: Svalbard).
 †C. plumites (N.Tian & Y.D.Wang 2014[a]) (Middle Jurassic: Liaoning, China).
 †C. preosmunda (Y.M.Cheng, Yu F.Wang & C.S.Li, 2007) (Middle Jurassic: Liaoning, China).
 †C. sinica (Y.M.Cheng & C.S.Li, 2007) (Middle Jurassic: Liaoning, China).
 †C. tekelili (E.I.Vera, 2012) (Early Cretaceous: West Antarctica).
 †C. wangii (N.Tian & Y.D.Wang, 2014[b]) (Middle Jurassic: Liaoning, China).
 †C. wehrii (C.N.Mill., 1982) (Miocene: Washington, USA).
†C. zhangiana Tian et al, 2021. (Middle Jurassic, Liaoning, China)

Distribution

North America
In eastern North America it occurs in: the Great Lakes region; eastern Canada – in southern Manitoba, Ontario, Quebec (north to tree line); and east to Newfoundland; eastern United States – upper New England south through the Appalachian Mountains and Atlantic seaboard,  into the Southeastern United States in Georgia and Alabama; and west across the Southern United States to Mississippi River, and back up the Mississippi embayment through the Midwestern United States to the Great Lakes.

Asia
In eastern Asia, the fern is found in the subtropical and temperate Asia in: the Eastern Himalaya,  South Central China and Eastern China, Taiwan, the Korean Peninsula, the Ryukyu Islands, and Japan.

Ecology
Claytosmunda claytoniana is found in humid zones, mostly in forests, but also in more open habitats and biomes, although rarely in bogs. The interrupted fern is often found alongside ostrich, cinnamon, and sensitive ferns.

Hybrids
Osmunda × ruggii, is a hybrid between C. claytoniana and O. spectabilis (American royal fern). The hybrid is considered important because it suggests a closer genetic relationship between C. claytoniana and O. spectabilis than between C. claytoniana and O. cinnamomeum (a fact which has led to moving O. cinnamomeum out of Osmunda and into its own genus Osmundastrum).  Osmunda × ruggii is sterile and is known from only about two natural populations, despite the many areas in which both C. claytoniana and O. spectabilis are found.

Uses

Medicinal
The Iroquois used the plant as treatment for blood disorders and venereal diseases.

References

Flora of North America: Osmunda claytoniana RangeMap:
Flora of Taiwan: Osmunda claytoniana

 Phipps, C. J., Taylor, T. N., Taylor, E. L., Cuneo, N. R., Boucher, L. D., and Yao, X. (1998). Osmunda (Osmundaceae) from the Triassic of Antarctica: An example of evolutionary stasis. American Journal of Botany, 85: 888–895

Osmundales
Ferns of the Americas
Ferns of Asia
Flora of China
Flora of Japan
Flora of Korea
Flora of Taiwan
Flora of the Northeastern United States
Flora of the North-Central United States
Flora of the Southeastern United States
Flora of Eastern Canada
Flora of Manitoba
Edible plants
Plants used in traditional Native American medicine
Monotypic fern genera